The Presidential Commission on the Supreme Court of the United States (PCSCOTUS), also known informally as the Supreme Court commission, was a Presidential Commission established by U.S. President Joe Biden to investigate the idea of reforming the Supreme Court. It will provide a nonpartisan analysis of "the principal arguments in the contemporary public debate for and against Supreme Court reform". The commission was established through Executive Order 14023, issued on April 9, 2021. According to the order, the commission must issue a report within 180 days of its first public meeting, which took place May 19, 2021. The commission issued its final report on December 8, 2021.

The commission was established several months after Amy Coney Barrett was nominated to the Supreme Court by then-president Donald Trump. This nomination was controversial, as it happened less than two months before the 2020 United States presidential election, and Republicans in 2016 had invoked the seldom-used Thurmond rule to block the nomination of Merrick Garland.

Members

Two of the commission's members, Caleb Nelson and Jack Goldsmith, had resigned their positions by October 2021.

Report 

 Presidential Commission on SCOTUS: Final Report
 Statement by Commissioners Griffith and Levi
 Statement by Commissioner White

See also 

 List of executive actions by Joe Biden#2021
 January 6 commission
 Judicial Procedures Reform Bill of 1937

References

External links
 

2021 establishments in the United States
United States Presidential Commissions
Presidency of Joe Biden
Supreme Court of the United States